This is a list of Indonesian musicians and musical groups from various genres.

Other name
/rif

0 - 9 
7icons — Girlband

A 
A. Rafiq — Dangdut male singer
Acha Septriasa — Pop female singer and actress
ADA Band — Pop rock/alternative rock band
Addie MS — Music composer, producer and conductor
Afgan — Pop/R&B/soul male singer and actor
Agnez Mo — Indonesian-American pop/R&B/soul singer/songwriter, dancer and actress
Ahmad Albar — Rock musician and vocalist of God Bless
Ahmad Band — Rock band whose led by Ahmad Dhani
Ahmad Dhani — Pop singer/songwriter, composer and record producer who owner of label music Republik Cinta Management
Amara — Soul/country singer and personnel of vocal group Lingua
Andien — Jazz female singer
Andmesh Kamaleng — Male pop/R&B/jazz singer, songwriter and winner of the 2nd season of Rising Star Indonesia
Anggun — Indonesian and French naturalised singer/songwriter
Ari Lasso — Pop/rock solo singer who was ex-vocalist of Dewa 19
Armageddon Holocaust — Old school black metal band
Ashilla Zee — Pop/rock singer
Ayu Ting Ting — Dangdut female singer
Ariel - male singer, singer/songwriter, musician

B 
Balawan — Jazz/rock/traditional/fusion guitarist and double neck guitar virtuoso
Benyamin Sueb — Traditional male singer and actor of Betawi descent
Bimbo — Religious group vocals
Bing Slamet — Indonesian singer, actor, and comedian
Blink — Pop/jazz girlband
Broery Marantika — Tenor male singer
Bunga Citra Lestari — Pop singer and actress
Burgerkill — Metalcore/death metal/metal core band who won 2013 Metal Hammer Golden Gods Awards in UK

C 
Camelia Malik — Dangdut female singer
Cherrybelle — Pop girlband
Chrisye — Pop/soul/progressive rock male singer
Cinta Laura — Electropop female singer, dancer, and actress who had begun her debut international career (as actress) in United States
Cita Citata — Dangdut female singer and actress
Citra Scholastika — Pop/jazz female singer and actress who was selected as runner-up of Indonesian Idol of season 6
CJR — Pop boyband
Cokelat — Hard rock/alternative rock band who won the category of Favorite Artist (Indonesia) at the 2003 MTV Asia Awards

D 
D'Cinnamons
D'Masiv
Danilla Riyadi — Indie singer
Dara Puspita — Indonesian flower generation girl group
Deadsquad
Detty Kurnia — Sundanese pop singer
Dewa 19 — Indonesian rock band
Dewa Budjana — Indonesian jazz guitarist
Dewi Lestari — Indonesian singer/songwriter and best selling author
Dewi Persik — Dangdut singer
Dewiq — Rock singer and songwriter
Dewi Sandra — Pop/R&B singer, dancer, actress and model
Didi Kempot — Campursari singer

E 
Ebiet G Ade —  Country/ballad/folk male singer
Efek Rumah Kaca
Elvy Sukaesih — Dangdut female diva and known as Queen of Dangdut Indonesia
Elwin Hendrijanto — Composer, producer, and pianist
Emilia Contessa —  Dangdut/Indo pop/keroncong female singer
Eros Djarot — Pop male singer/songwriter
Erwin Gutawa — Indonesian composer, songwriter, and bassist
Eva Celia
Evie Tamala — Dangdut female singer

F 
Fatin Shidqia — Indonesian Pop Singer, winner of the first season of X Factor Indonesia
Fariz RM — Indonesian Pop Music Maestro
.Feast — Rock band

G 
Gesang — Keroncong musician
Gigi — Rock band
Glenn Fredly — Pop/R&B/jazz musician
Gita Gutawa — Pop/classical female singer, she won The 6th International Nile Children Song Festival in Cairo
God Bless — Rock group
Gombloh — Pop singer and songwriter
Gordon Tobing — Folk singer and songwriter 
Guruh Sukarnoputra — Musician/songwriter

H 
Harmony Chinese Music Group
Harry Roesli — Avant-garde musician
Hellcrust
HMGNC

I 
Ian Antono — Indonesian guitarist and songwriter
Ida Laila — Female dangdut singer
Iis Dahlia — Female dangdut singer
Ikke Nurjanah — Female dangdut singer
Iksan Skuter — Indie folk/country singer
Indra Lesmana — Jazz musician, singer, songwriter and record producer
Indah Dewi Pertiwi — Indonesian pop singer, dancer, model
Inul Daratista — Dangdut female singer
 Irma Pane — Pop female singer
Irwansyah — Pop singer and actor
Ismail Marzuki — Writer of patriotic songs
Iwa K — Male rapper
Iwan Fals — Folk/country/ballad male singer
Isyana Sarasvati — Pop/RnB/jazz/soul female singer, pianist, and songwriter

J 
James F. Sundah — Songwriter
Jamrud — Hard rock/heavy metal band. 
Jikustik — Pop rock band
JKT48 —  Idol group, Indonesian sister band of Japanese AKB48
Jockie Soerjoprajogo — Musician, keyboarder, and songwriter
Joy Tobing — Winner of Indonesian Idol season 1
J-Rocks — Rock band
Julia Perez — Dangdut singer, actress, and model for FHM and Maxim France

K 
Kahitna — Pop band
Kekal — Heavy metal and electronic music band
Kerispatih — Pop band
Keisya Levronka — Pop female singer
Koes Plus — One of Indonesia's earliest pop band
Koil — Industrial rock/heavy metal band
Kotak — Pop/rock band
Krisdayanti — Pop/R&B female singer
Killing Me Inside — Modern rock emo

L
Lilis Suryani
Lingua - Indonesian vocal group
Lesti Kejora - Female dangdut singer
Letto - Indonesian pop band
Lyodra Ginting - Indonesian pop singer

M 
 Mahalini — Pop Female singer
 Maliq & D'Essentials — Jazz group
 Marshanda — Pop/R&B female singer and actress
 Mansyur S. — Dangdut male singer
 Marthino Lio
 Maudy Ayunda — Female singer/songwriter and actress
 Melky Goeslaw — Pop Male Singer
 Melly Goeslaw — Pop/R&B/dance singer/songwriter, record producer
 Meriam Bellina — Pop singer and actress
 Mike Mohede — Winner of Indonesian Idol season 2
 Mocca — Retro swing/jazz band
 Mulan Jameela — Pop singer and formerly of duo Ratu

N 
 Nafa Urbach — Indonesian rock/dangdut singer
 Naif — Rock band
 Nasida Ria — Qasidah modern group
 Naura Ayu
 Neonomora
 Netral — Indonesian rock/punk band
 Nicky Astria — Indonesian rock singer
 Nike Ardilla — Indonesia Rock, Pop Rock, Blues, metal singer
 Niki — R&B singer, record producer
 Nidji — Pop band
 Noah — alternative pop/rock band
 Norazia — Funk/soul/pop singer
 Novita Dewi — Indonesian pop/rock/gospel singer, grand champion of Astana International Song Festival 2005 in Kazakhstan
 Nu Dimension — Indonesian boy band, 2nd runner-up of X Factor Indonesia first season

O
Once — Pop singer

P 
 Padi — Alternative rock band, MTV Asia Awards 2002's winner on the category Most Favourite Indonesian Artist
 Pamungkas
 Panbers — Pop/rock/spiritual/keroncong group
 Pasto-1 — Pop/rock/R&B group
 Pee Wee Gaskins — Rock/pop-punk band
 Pinkan Mambo — Pop/R&B female singer, formerly of duo Ratu
 Prilly Latuconsina — Pop female singer and actress
 Project Pop — Indonesian comedic band 
 Purgatory — Metal band

R 
 Radja — Pop/rock band
 Rainych — J-Pop/City Pop female singer
 Ratu — Female pop/R&B/rock duo
 RAN — Jazz/funk/hip-hop/pop group
 Rhoma Irama — Dangdut male singer/songwriter, musician, actor, politician. He recognised as The King of Dangdut Indonesia
 Rini Wulandari — Indonesian pop/RnB singer. Winner of Indonesian Idol season 4
 Rizky Febian — Male pop, RnB, soul & jazz singer, songwriter. He is the son of the comedian Sule
 Rossa — pop/R&B/soul female singer
 Ruth Sahanaya — Pop/R&B/classic female singer
 Raisa — Pop/R&B/soul/jazz female singer
 Rich Brian — Indonesian rapper/comedian

S 
Sajama Cut — Indie rock band
SambaSunda — Ethnic music fusion group
Samsons — Pop rock band
Sandhy Sondoro — Pop/adult contemporary male singer and winner of the 2009 International Contest of Young Pop Singer New Wave in Latvia
Seringai — Rock/stoner band
Seventeen — Pop rock band
Sheila on 7 — Pop/alternative rock band
Sherina Munaf — Female pop singer/songwriter and former most popular child star
Sheryl Sheinafia — Female pop/soul singer
Siksakubur
Siti Badriah — Female dangdut singer
Slamet Abdul Sjukur — Contemporary musician
Slank — Rock band
SM*SH — Boyband
Soimah Pancawati
Sore — Indonesian rock revival/psychedelic band
SOS — Girlband
 Raden Ajeng Srimulat — Keroncong singer 
ST 12 — Pop band
Stephanie Poetri
Sule — Comedian and pop singer
Superman Is Dead — Punk rock band
Super Girlies
Super 7 — Pop boyband 
Syahrini — Pop female singer/songwriter and actress

T 
Tantowi Yahya — Indonesian well-known country singer, TV presenter and member of Indonesian house of representative
Terry Shahab — Pop female singer
Tiara Andini
Tielman Brothers — First Indonesian band
Tika and The Dissidents - Indonesian indie pop
Tipe-X — Ska band
Titi DJ — Pop/R&B/soul female singer, Indonesian representative at Miss World 1983
Titiek Puspa — Pop female singer
The Changcuters — Garage rock/rock & roll band
The S.I.G.I.T. — Garage rock band
Trees & Wild — Post-rock/folk band
Tulus — Pop/soul/jazz male  singer

U 
Ungu — Pop/rock band
UN1TY

V 
Via Vallen — Dangdut/pop female singer 
Vidi Aldiano — Pop male singer
Vina Panduwinata — Pop female singer

W 
Wage Rudolf Supratman — Musician/songwriter, creator of Indonesia national anthem
Wali — Pop creative band
Waljinah — Keroncong female singer
Weird Genius — Electro-pop group
West Java Syndicate — Ethnic-fusion group
White Shoes & The Couples Company — Rock/pop/jazz band

Y 
Yana Julio — Pop jazzy male artist
Yovie & Nuno — Pop band
Yuni Shara — Pop female singer
Yura Yunita — Pop female singer

Z 
Zeke and the Popo — Psychedelic/folkrock/ambient band
Ziva Magnolya

References

 
Indonesian musicians and musical groups